Miroslav Žamboch (born 13 January 1972) is a Czech physicist and author known for writing novels and short stories in the science fiction and fantasy genres.

A native of the Moravian town of Hranice, Miroslav Žamboch graduated with a degree in physics from the Department of Nuclear Sciences and Physical Engineering of the Czech Technical University in Prague. He works at the Institute for Nuclear Studies and, since the mid-1990s, has written over twenty novels and several collections of short stories.

In 2011, upon the occasion of his work translation to Korean, he has been described as a representative of the most recent generation of Czech science fiction and fantasy writers. As of 2013 at least seventeen of his books have been translated into Polish.

Žamboch is also known as an outdoorsman and physical fitness enthusiast, having participated in judo exhibitions, amateur boxing, mountain climbing and downhill cycling.

Selected works

Series
series Knižní (5 books as of 2014)
series Bakly (5 books as of 2014)
series Agent John Francis Kovář (11 books as of 2014)

Books not part of a series

 Poslední bere vše, Poutník,  2000
 Seržant, Poutník, 2002
 Meč proti sekeře, 2003
 Megapolis, 2004
 Líheň, two part novel:
 Part 1.: Smrt zrozená v Praze, Wolf Publishing, 2004,
 Part 2.: Královna smrti, Wolf Publishing, 2005,
 Líheň, both parts, Triton, 2009,
 Na křídlech tornáda, 2004
 Jennifer, Triton, Prague 2005, micro novel
 Maverick – Pěšec na odpis, Triton, Prague 2006, micro novel
 Basil – valašský vojvoda, Triton, Prague 2006, micro novel
 Drsný spasitel, 2007
 Predátoři, 2007
 Dlouhý sprint s ozvěnou, 2009
 Visio in Extremis, 2011
 Živí a mrtví, Freetim(e)publishing, Prague 2011, short stories,
 Ve službách klanu, 2013
 Zakuti v oceli, Triton, Prague 2016,.

References

External links
  Miroslav Žamboch's personal website including biographical information and list of works
  Biographical sketch of Miroslav Žamboch, including a photograph, on SCIFIWORLD 
  A chronological list of 19 articles edited by Miroslav Žamboch for Fantasy Planet)
  Miroslav Žamboch's entry at LEGIE, the scifi and fantasy book database

Czech science fiction writers
Czech physicists
Nuclear physicists
1972 births
Living people
Academic staff of Czech Technical University in Prague
Czech Technical University in Prague alumni